Boom is a Belgian town, located in both the arrondissement and province of Antwerp. In 2021, Boom had a total population of 18,799. The total area is 7.37 km² (2.85 sq mi). Residents are known as "Boomenaren".

Since 2005, Boom has hosted the annual electronic dance music event Tomorrowland.

History 

Recorded history of this community started in the late 1300s. The population increase in Boom occurred some time during the 19th century. In Boom, people venerate a statue of the lady of Boom.

Geography
Boom is located between three big cities (Brussels, Antwerp and Ghent), and is situated along the Rupel river.

Climate
Boom has a oceanic climate (Köppen climate classification: Cfb).

Economy
Because of the presence of clay around Boom, the region is well known for and has many clay pits and brick factories.

Notable people
 Egidius Aerts (1822–1853), flautist and composer
 Glen De Boeck (1971), football player and coach.
 Peter Dens (1690–1775), Catholic theologian.
 Herbert Flack (1913–1995), actor.
 Romelu Lukaku (1993), football player.
 Bobbejaan Schoepen (1925), singer-songwriter, guitarist and art whistler. He was also an actor, fantasist and founder of the Bobbejaanland amusement park in Belgium.
 Kevin Seeldraeyers (1986), cyclist.
 Jean-François van de Velde (1779–1838), 20th bishop of Ghent.
 Roland Van Campenhout (1984), musician.
 Jozef Van Lerius (1823–1876), painter.
 Frans Verschoren (1874–1951), writer.
 Bjorn Vleminckx (1986), football player.
 Charles Augustin Wauters (1808–1869), painter.

Events
 Tomorrowland: EDM World-famous and largest Dance Music festival in the world, that almost 2 million people have attended since its 2005 launch. Next Tomorrowland is scheduled to be held in July 2023.
 Feria Andaluza: Spanish festival in De Schorre.

Sports
 K. Rupel Boom F.C.: Football club, currently playing in the Belgian Third Division.
 Kangeroes Boom: Basketball club, currently playing in the second division.
 Braxgata: Hockey club, currently playing in the first division. Hockey club of the year by the European Hockey Federation (EHF) in 2009.
 Fudji Yama Boom-Niel-Schelle: Judo club, founded in 1958
 Cyclo-cross Boom, an annual day of cyclocross races

Movies 
The movie La Kermesse héroïque (Carnival in Flanders) directed by Jacques Feyder in 1935 takes place in the town of Boom.

References

External links

 Boom municipality official website. 

 
Populated places in Antwerp Province
Municipalities of Antwerp Province